Gary Keane (born 4 January 1964) is a former Australian rules footballer who played with Fitzroy in the Victorian Football League (VFL).

Keane, a forward, was recruited to Fitzroy from Koroit. He had his best season in 1987, when he kicked 23 goals, took 105 marks and earned 10 Brownlow Medal votes (equal most by a Fitzroy player).

At the end of the 1989 season, in which Keane didn't play a game, Fitzroy traded him to Geelong, in exchange for a second round selection in the 1989 VFL Draft. He was sacked by Geelong without playing a senior game. He later played for Frankston in the Victorian Football Association.

References

1964 births
Australian rules footballers from Victoria (Australia)
Fitzroy Football Club players
Frankston Football Club players
Koroit Football Club players
Living people